Peter James may refer to:

Peter James (historian), British author and historian
Peter James (writer) (born 1948), British writer of crime fiction and film producer
Peter Francis James (born 1956), African-American actor and voice-over artist
Peter James (cinematographer) (born 1947), Australian cinematographer
Peter James (set decorator) (1924–1997), English set decorator
Peter James (rugby union) (born 1935), rugby union player who represented Australia
Peter James (cricketer) (born 1971), played for Surrey
Peter Stanley James (1917–1999), Royal Air Force officer
Peter Wilfred James (1930–2014), English botanist and lichenologist
Pete James (1958–2018), curator of photography

See also